The 2004 WGC-Accenture Match Play Championship was a golf tournament that was played from February 25–29, 2004 at La Costa Resort and Spa in Carlsbad, California. It was the sixth WGC-Accenture Match Play Championship and the first of four World Golf Championships events held in 2004.

Tiger Woods won his eighth World Golf Championships event, and his second match play back-to-back, by defeating Davis Love III 3 and 2 in the 36 hole final.

Brackets
The Championship was a single elimination match play event. The field consisted of the top 64 players available from the Official World Golf Rankings, seeded according to the rankings. Ernie Els (ranked 3) withdrew from the event, electing to stay home because his daughter was to start school in London the next week. Jim Furyk (ranked 5) withdrew because of a wrist injury and Kirk Triplett (ranked 42) also withdrew for personal reasons. They were replaced by Briny Baird (ranked 65), Shingo Katayama (ranked 66) and John Rollins (ranked 67).

Bobby Jones bracket

Ben Hogan bracket

Gary Player bracket

Sam Snead bracket

Final Four

Breakdown by country

Prize money breakdown

References

External links
 Bracket source
 Bracket PDF source
 About the matches

WGC Match Play
Golf in California
Carlsbad, California
Sports competitions in San Diego County, California
WGC-Accenture Match Play Championship
WGC-Accenture Match Play Championship
WGC-Accenture Match Play Championship